"I Take a Lot of Pride in What I Am"  is a song written and performed by American country music artist Merle Haggard and The Strangers.  It was released in October 1968 as the only single from his album Pride in What I Am.  The song peaked at number three on the U.S. Billboard Hot Country Singles chart. It reached number-one on the Canadian RPM Country Tracks in January 1969. The song was covered by Dean Martin and released as a single in mid-1969.  A tape recorder version of this song was played at the funeral of late Lynyrd Skynyrd vocalist, Ronnie Van Zant.

Personnel
Merle Haggard– vocals, guitar

The Strangers:
Roy Nichols – guitar, harmonica
Norman Hamlet – steel guitar
George French – piano
Jerry Ward – bass
Eddie Burris – drums

Chart performance
Merle Haggard

Dean Martin

Jerry Butler

References

1968 singles
1968 songs
Merle Haggard songs
Dean Martin songs
Songs written by Merle Haggard
Song recordings produced by Ken Nelson (American record producer)
Capitol Records singles